The 2020  World Grand Prix was a professional snooker tournament which took place from 3 to 9 February 2020 in the Centaur at Cheltenham Racecourse in Cheltenham, England. It was the eleventh ranking event of the 2019–20 snooker season, and the first of three Coral Cup tournaments. The 2020 edition of the World Grand Prix was sponsored by the betting company Coral. The event had 32 participants, with players qualifying by virtue of their ranking points during the 2019–20 season. It had a prize fund of £380,000, with £100,000 going to the winner.

The defending champion was Judd Trump, who had beaten Ali Carter 10–6 in the 2019 final. Trump was defeated, 3–4, in the second round by Kyren Wilson. Neil Robertson won the tournament for the first time (his 18th ranking title)  with a 10–8 victory against Graeme Dott in the final. It was the third consecutive final in the season for Robertson, who lost just one match in the event. It had 32 century breaks, with the highest a 142 by Robertson in the final.

Format
The 2020 World Grand Prix was a professional snooker tournament held from 3 to 9 February 2020 in the Centaur at Cheltenham Racecourse, Cheltenham, England. It had 32 participants from players with the most ranking points in the 2019–20 snooker season at the beginning of the tournament. To qualify for the event, players were chosen from points earned in the preceding ten ranking tournaments, rather than by world rankings. Points scored at events from the 2019 Riga Masters until the 2020 German Masters added towards qualifying for the event. The World Grand Prix was the first of three events in the Coral Cup, with the Players Championship and Tour Championship. It was the eleventh ranking event of the snooker season, following the German Masters and preceding the Welsh Open.

Prize fund
The event had a total prize fund of £380,000, with £100,000 to the winner. The participation prize was £5,000, which did not count towards a player's world ranking. The breakdown of prize money for the event was:

 Winner: £100,000
 Runner-up: £40,000
 Semi-final: £20,000
 Quarter-final: £12,500
 Last 16: £7,500
 Last 32: £5,000 (Prize money at this stage did not count towards prize money rankings)
 Highest break: £10,000
 Total: £380,000

Seeding list

Summary

Early rounds
Scott Donaldson and Kurt Maflin made their debuts in the event. The first round of the tournament was played as best-of-seven- matches. Three-time world champion Mark Williams defeated Barry Hawkins 4–2, despite an attack of gout. The 2019 UK Championship winner Ding Junhui met Scott Donaldson (after competed at the previous two tournaments: the 2020 European Masters and the 2020 German Masters), with Donaldson winning both. Donaldson won the match, whitewashing Ding 4–0 and eliminating him at three straight events. Second seed and 2019 China Open champion Shaun Murphy lost to Matthew Stevens, 3–4.

Five-time world champion Ronnie O'Sullivan was ranked 22nd for the event, since he had missed some of the season's ranking events. Defending champion Judd Trump defeated Li Hang 4–1, which Sporting Life called a "demolition". Sixth-seeded Mark Allen lost to Liang Wenbo 2–4, and Thepchaiya  lost on a deciding frame to Matthew Selt. The 2020 European Masters champion Neil Robertson defeated Michael Holt 4–3, also on a deciding frame. Kyren Wilson, John Higgins, Joe Perry, Graeme Dott and Tom Ford were victorious in other matches.

World champion Judd Trump met 16th seed Kyren Wilson in the second round. Wilson led 3–1, before Trump won the next two frames to force a deciding frame. Wilson took the deciding frame to win 4–3. Ronnie O'Sullivan and Liang Wenbo also went to a deciding frame; O'Sullivan won 4–3, scoring back-to-back centuries in the first two frames. Gary Wilson defeated Matthew Stevens 4–1; Graeme Dott and Neil Robertson completed 4–0 whitewashes of Xiao Guodong and Mark Williams, respectively. Tom Ford defeated Matthew Selt, and Joe Perry defeated Scott Donaldson (both 4–2) in the other second-round matches.

Quarter- and semi-finals
The quarter-finals were played as best-of-9-frames matches. Kyren Wilson drew John Higgins who won the first two frames Wilson won the next two frames with breaks of 64 and 89 to tie the match, 2–2. The next four frames were shared, leading to a deciding frame. Wilson made two breaks, and Higgins needed  to win. Although Higgins drew two fouls, Wilson won the match after potting a long . Joe Perry won the first frame of his match with Neil Robertson with a break of 86 before Robertson won the next five frames to win, 5–1. Ronnie O'Sullivan won the opening frame against Graeme Dott, who then won the next three frames. O'Sullivan tied the match, 3–3, with a break of 102 in frame six. Dott won the next two frames for a 5–3 victory, with breaks of 52 and 91. It was Dott's first win against O'Sullivan in nine years. In the other quarter-final, Tom Ford defeated Gary Wilson 5–2. After the match, he said that his form had improved due to his "mind coach".

The semi-finals were played as best-of-11-frames matches. Neil Robertson won the first three frames of his match with Kyren Wilson with breaks of 80, 59 and 77. Wilson then won three of the next four, including a break of 129, to trail 3–4. Robertson led 5–4 before making a break of 68 to win, 6–4. The second semi-final was played by Graeme Dott and Tom Ford. Dott was playing in his second consecutive semi-final, after reaching that stage at the German Masters. Ford led 4–3 before Dott won three frames in a row with breaks of 81, 67 and 70 to win, 6–3.

Final

The final was played over two sessions as a best-of-19-frames match. Robertson was playing in his third straight ranking final, after he won the European Masters and was runner-up at the German Masters. Dott had not won an event since the 2007 China Open, and last reached a ranking final in 2018. This was a rematch of the 2010 World Snooker Championship final, which Robertson had won. The final was refereed by Leo Scullion. Robertson took the opening frame and made a break of 63 in the second,  losing the frame by six points. Dott won frame three before Robertson won four frames in a row (including a break of 127) to lead, 5–2. Dott won the final frame of the opening session to trail, 3–5.

He then won two of the first three frames in the evening session to trail, 5–6. Dott scored only a single point across the next three frames, Robertson earning 313 taking all three frames. Dott won the next two frames to trail, 7–9; but required two snookers in frame 17 to be able to win. Dott secured the foul shots to trail 8–9, before Robertson won frame 18 to win the match, 10–8. After the match, he said that he had been a "bit twitchy" near the end. Dott called Robertson "a machine". Robertson made five century breaks during the final, including the tournament's highest break – a 142 – in frame 12.

Tournament draw
The event featured five single elimination rounds featuring 32 players. Below is the bracket for the event. Players in bold denote match winners.

Final

Century breaks
A total of 33 century breaks were made at the tournament. The highest was a 142, made by Neil Robertson in frame 13 of the final.

 142, 140, 127, 110, 107, 105, 101, 100, 100  Neil Robertson
 138, 100, 100  Judd Trump
 134  Matthew Selt
 132, 129, 120, 102, 100  Ronnie O'Sullivan
 131, 111  Mark Selby
 130  Mark Allen
 129  Li Hang
 129  Kyren Wilson
 122  Michael Holt
 120, 114  Scott Donaldson
 115  David Gilbert
 107  Thepchaiya Un-Nooh
 106  Joe Perry
 105  Liang Wenbo
 103  Graeme Dott
 103  Zhao Xintong
 101  Xiao Guodong

References

2020
Players Series
2020 in snooker
2020 in English sport
2020
February 2020 sports events in the United Kingdom
Sport in Cheltenham